Juan Tomás de Rocaberti (Joan Tomàs de Rocabertí in Catalan, 4 March 1627 – 13 June 1699) was a Catalan theologian.

Biography 
Rocaberti was born into a noble family at Perelada, in Catalonia.  Educated at Girona, he entered the Dominican convent there, receiving the habit in 1640. His success in theological studies at the convent of Valencia secured for him the chair of theology in the University of Valencia.

In 1666 he was chosen provincial of Aragon, and in 1670 the General Chapter elected him general of the order. The celebrated Dominican Vincent Contenson dedicated to him his Theologia mentis et cordis.

In 1676 he was appointed by Carlos II of Spain first Archbishop of Valencia, and then governor of that province. In 1695 he was made inquisitor-general of Spain.

He obtained the canonization of Sts. Louis Bertrand and Rose of Lima, the solemn beatification of Pius V, and the annual celebration in the order of the feast of Bl. Albert the Great and others.

Historian John Langdon-Davies described Rocaberti as a "fanatical ascetic, he never wore linen or silk, he only ate vegetables and fish, his bed was more like a martyr's rack than a high ecclesiastic's resting place."

Rocaberti died at Madrid.

Doctrine 

Rocaberti is best known as an active apologist of the papacy, against Gallicans and Protestants.

His first work in the sense was De Romani pontificis in temporalibus auctoritate (3 vols., Valentia, 1691–94). His most important work is the Bibliotheca Maxima Pontificia (21 vols., Rome, 1697–1700). In this monumental work the author collected and published in alphabetical order, and in their entirety, all the important works dealing with the primacy of the Holy See from an orthodox point of view, beginning with Abraham Bzovius and ending with Zacharias Boverius. A summary is given in Hurter's Nomenclator.

Works 
De Romani pontificis in temporalibus auctoritate, 3 vols., Valentia, 1691–94.
 
 
 
Bibliotheca Maxima Pontificia, 21 vols., Rome, 1697–1700.

References 

 Sources:
 Quétif-Échard, Script. ord. Prad., II (Paris, 1721), 630, 827; 
 Touron, Hist. des hom. Ill. De l'ordre Dom., V (Paris, 1748), 714–26; 
 Hugo von Hurter, Nomenclator literarius recentioris theologiae catholicae, II: Année Dominicaine, XIII, 785.

17th-century Spanish Roman Catholic theologians
Spanish Dominicans
Masters of the Order of Preachers
Archbishops of Valencia
17th-century Roman Catholic archbishops in Spain
Grand Inquisitors of Spain
1627 births
1699 deaths
People from Alt Empordà